The International Association for the Properties of Water and Steam (IAPWS)  is an international non-profit association of national organizations concerned with the properties of water and steam, particularly thermophysical properties and other aspects of high-temperature steam, water and aqueous mixtures that are relevant to thermal power cycles and other industrial applications.

The organization publishes a range of 'releases.'  Specifically, these relate to the thermal and expansion properties of steam.
Both free software and commercial software implementations of the IAPWS correlations are available.

Thermodynamics